The Last Unicorn EP (HAC39) was released by the Australian band Swirl in 1995 on the record label Half A Cow. It contains two cover songs - Nick Cave's "The Ship Song" and The Carpenters' "Calling Occupants".

Track listing
 "The Last Unicorn"
 "The Goodbye Soldier"
 "The Ship Song"
 "Calling Occupants"

1995 EPs